Hitler Goes Kaput! is a Russian 2008 spy comedy film directed by Maryus Vaysberg. The picture was followed by a sequel titled Rzhevsky Versus Napoleon.

The film includes many humorous references to Seventeen Moments of Spring.

Plot
The Great Patriotic War is coming to an end, and soon will be May 9, 1945. Soviet intelligence officer Alexander Isaevich ("Shura") Osechkin works as an SS officer in Berlin under the name of Standartenführer Olaf Schurenberg. He is engaged in office work and hangs out in nightclubs.

Soon radio operator Zina is sent from the Center. Shura and Zina fall in love with each other.

Müller sends Iron Hans to deal with Schurenberg, but Shura manages to kill Hans. Bormann blackmails Shurenberg under the threat that he will tell everyone that he is a spy if Schurenberg does not agree to intimate relations with him.

Shurenberg, realizing that he is on the verge of failure, is going to leave on a special channel to his homeland. At this point, the Gestapo seizes and tortures Zina. Shurenberg deceitfully signs the document for her transfer from Bormann and takes her away. They together attack Adolf Hitler and Eva Braun, tie them up and take away their clothes. After changing clothes, they try to leave the Gestapo, but they are discovered. They run away and drive by car to the border. On the Soviet border, they understand that their homeland is not very happy to see them either, and now they are fleeing both from the Germans and from the Russians. Kuzmich (Shura's friend) opens a door in a wall through which they leave. In the final scene, Shura and Zina flee into the distance.

Cast
Pavel Derevyanko — Standartenfuhrer SS Olaf Shurenberg / scout Alexander Isaevich Osechkin
Anna Semenovich — radio operator Zina
Mikhail Krylov — Adolf Hitler
Evelina Bledans —  Untersturmführer  Frau Oddo
Yuri Stoyanov — Reichsleiter  Martin Bormann
Yuri Galtsev —  Gruppenführer Heinrich Müller
Anfisa Chekhova — sex cipherer
Alexey Buldakov — Kuzmich
Alexey Ogurtsov — Iron Hans
Maxim Maksimenko — Reichsführer SS Heinrich Himmler
Yuri Mikhaylik — Franklin Roosevelt
Timati — DJ 50 Bundes-Shilling / super-agent Timati
Mikhail Galustyan — lucky partisan Rabinovich
Ksenia Sobchak — Eva Braun
Igor Gasparyan — engineer Garik
Ilya Oleynikov — underground worker / Joseph Stalin
Vladimir Shcherbakov — Lavrentiy Beria
Zoya Buryak — pimp
Alexander Pershin — Red Army commander
Alexander Bezrukov — Obersturmbannführer Kurt Eismann
Nikolay Danilyuk —  Brigadeführer  Walter Schellenberg

Production
The film was shot in Lviv.

Release

Controversy
Organization "Communists of St. Petersburg and Lenoblast" attempted to get the film banned, and also that the creators of the picture would be prohibited from working in cinema.

Reception
The picture received mostly negative reviews.

References

External links

Films directed by Maryus Vaysberg
Russian parody films
2000s parody films
Cultural depictions of Adolf Hitler
Cultural depictions of Eva Braun
Cultural depictions of Heinrich Himmler
Cultural depictions of Franklin D. Roosevelt
Cultural depictions of Lavrentiy Beria
Cultural depictions of Joseph Stalin
Films shot in Ukraine
Slapstick films
2000s spy comedy films
2008 films
Stierlitz
Russian spy comedy films
Russian World War II films
2000s Russian-language films